Between August 5 and 7, 2022, suspected ADF forces attacked the villages of Kandoyi and Bandiboli, in Ituri Province, Democratic Republic of the Congo. During the attacks, ADF militiamen burned down houses and attacked residents, killing 10 people in Kandoyi and 5 others in Bandiboli. Fighting between Congolese forces, Mai-Mai, and other rebel groups occurred in the area at the time.

Background 
Civil war has raged in Eastern Congo since the late 2000's, with rebel groups such as Mai-Mai, M23, and the jihadist ADF all fighting to control territory along ethnic and religious lines against the Congolese government and MONUSCO. In recent months, fighting in Ituri province, where Kandoyi and Bandiboli are located, has intensified. ADF attacks have killed over 370 civilians since April 2022. Just a day before the Kandoyi and Bandiboli attacks, rebels of the Zaire militia attacked a funeral in the ethnically-Musaba village of Damas, killing 22 people and injuring 16 others.

Attack timeline 
On the night of Friday, August 5, alleged ADF rebels attacked the village of Kandoyi, killing between nine and ten people in the village, while also burning houses down. One civilian was also killed in Bandiboli. On Saturday morning, rebels attacked Bandiboli, killing five civilians. Fighting between the Congolese army and rebels also began in Bandiboli on Saturday morning. A Congolese army captain was also killed in the clashes, although it is unknown which village.

References 

August 2022 crimes in Africa
Ituri conflict
2022 in the Democratic Republic of the Congo
Attacks in Africa in 2022
Massacres in the Democratic Republic of the Congo
Massacres in 2022
Attacks on buildings and structures in 2022